Dublin Cathedral may refer to:
St Mary's Pro-Cathedral, the Roman Catholic cathedral of the Archdiocese of Dublin
Christ Church Cathedral, Dublin, the Church of Ireland cathedral of the Diocese of Dublin 
St Patrick's Cathedral, Dublin, the Church of Ireland national cathedral in Dublin, Ireland